The 1999 McDonald's PBA All-Filipino Cup Finals was the best-of-7 basketball championship series of the 1999 PBA All-Filipino Cup, and the conclusion of the conference playoffs. The Formula Shell Zoom Masters and Tanduay Rhum Masters played for the 72nd championship contested by the league.

Formula Shell captured the All-Filipino Cup crown, becoming the 10th team to win the league's most prestigious tournament, defeating Tanduay Rhum Masters, four games to two, for their fourth championship and repeated as back-to-back champions.

Qualification

Series scoring summary

Games summary

Game 1

Shell erased a 14-point deficit to grab the lead at 61–60. The Rhum Masters showed composure and held their ground to wore the Turbo Chargers in the endgame. Bobby Jose chipped in 19 points, including two layups that broke the backs of the rallying Shell. Alvarado and Menk were held to a combined output of 44 points by the Shell defenders.

Game 2

Shell rallied from 18 points down in the fourth quarter in a come-from-behind victory. The Zoom Masters were down, 49–63, entering the final period. Four straight points by the Rhum Masters gave them their biggest lead at 67–49.

Game 3

From a slim 70–69 advantage for Shell in the fourth quarter, Victor Pablo scored seven straight points that started an 8–3 run for the Zoom Masters which gave them a six-point edge, 78–72. Tanduay forward Sonny Alvarado was called for his sixth foul and a technical. A three-point shot by Noy Castillo put Shell on top by seven points at 83–76. Rookie Eric Menk scored 42 big points for the Rhum Masters.

Game 4

Sonny Alvarado keyed Tanduay's huge run that padded a 40–34 halftime lead to a 55–42 bulge. The Rhum Masters' defense limited Shell to a lone basket in the first seven minutes of the fourth quarter with Alvarado, Eric Menk and Jason Webb chipped in baskets of their own, giving Tanduay their biggest lead at 72–48.

Game 5

Shell found a hero in Gerald Esplana, who scored 14 points in the fourth quarter alone and wound up with 25 points.

Game 6

Benjie Paras and Victor Pablo scored 23 and 21 points respectively, Rhum Masters' Sonny Alvarado, who had a triple-double of 18 points, 13 rebounds and 10 assists, was ejected with 3:57 to go due to two technical fouls.

Rosters

Broadcast notes

References

External links
 PBA official website

1999 PBA season
1999
Tanduay Rhum Masters games
Shell Turbo Chargers games
PBA All-Filipino Cup Finals
PBA All-Filipino Cup Finals